Cora buapana is a species of basidiolichen in the family Hygrophoraceae. Found in Mexico, it was formally described as a new species in 2019 by Bibiana Moncada, Rosa Emilia Pérez-Pérez, and Robert Lücking. The specific epithet pays tribute to the Benemérita Universidad Autónoma de Puebla (BUAP), which is the oldest and largest university in the state of Puebla.

Cora buapana is only known to occur in a small region of Oaxaca, where it grows as an epiphyte on tree and shrub branches, typically over and around mosses and liverworts. Cora benitoana is a sympatic species.

References

buapana
Lichen species
Lichens described in 2019
Lichens of Mexico
Taxa named by Robert Lücking
Basidiolichens